Nestoras Gekas (born 7 March 1995) is a Greek professional footballer who plays as a goalkeeper for Super League 2 club Anagennisi Karditsa.

References

1995 births
Living people
Greek footballers
Panathinaikos F.C. players
Fostiras F.C. players
Kallithea F.C. players
Athlitiki Enosi Larissa F.C. players
Anagennisi Karditsa F.C. players
Panthrakikos F.C. players
PGS Kissamikos players
Apollon Larissa F.C. players
Levadiakos F.C. players
Enosi Panaspropyrgiakou Doxas players
Super League Greece players
Association football goalkeepers
Football League (Greece) players
Super League Greece 2 players
Footballers from Karditsa